Villa Francaise des Jeunes (VFJ) is a French-language middle school and high school located in Elliot Lake, Ontario, Canada.  The school shares a track field with the neighbouring Elliot Lake Secondary School (ELSS). Founded in 1977, the institution has seen a drastic drop in enrolment for many years, which has seen some students participating in video-conferencing classes with many other students from all over Northern Ontario. The enrolment  was 16 (middle school) and 45 (high school).

See also
List of high schools in Ontario

References

External links

French-language high schools in Ontario
High schools in Algoma District
Education in Elliot Lake
Buildings and structures in Elliot Lake
Educational institutions established in 1977
1977 establishments in Ontario